Zhavarud may refer to:
 Zhavarud-e Gharbi Rural District
 Zhavarud-e Sharqi Rural District

See also
 Zhavehrud Rural District